Fort St. Joseph may refer to:

In Canada
Fort St. Joseph (Ontario), on St. Joseph Island at southern end of the St. Marys River, now the site of Fort St. Joseph National Historic Site Canada

In the United States
Fort St. Joseph (Port Huron), on north end of the St. Clair River in what is now Port Huron, Michigan
Fort St. Joseph (Niles, Michigan), on the St. Joseph River near what is now Niles, Michigan

Other
Fort-Liberté, previously known as Fort St. Joseph, in Haiti
Fort St. Joseph, Bakel, Senegal